Charles Miller (born August 2, 1953) is a retired Canadian football player who played for the Edmonton Eskimos of the Canadian Football League (CFL). He played college football at West Virginia University.

References

1953 births
Living people
American football defensive backs
Canadian football defensive backs
American players of Canadian football
West Virginia Mountaineers football players
Edmonton Elks players
Players of American football from West Virginia
Sportspeople from Fairmont, West Virginia